Patrick Anthony Keane  (born 26 October 1952) is a former Justice of the High Court of Australia and a former Chief Justice of the Federal Court of Australia. He will soon join as a judge on the Hong Kong Court of Final Appeal.

Early life and education
Patrick Anthony Keane was born to Patrick and Margaret Keane (née Houseman) and raised in Wilston, a middle-class, inner-city suburb in northern Brisbane, Queensland. Patrick Keane senior was an RAAF aviator who died from a heart attack when the younger Patrick was seven. 

Keane was educated at Catholic schools: St. Columba's Convent School and St. Joseph's College, Gregory Terrace in Brisbane, where he was the school captain and dux of 1969, winning an Open Scholarship in the Queensland Senior Public Examinations. After eliminating other vocations, he graduated from the University of Queensland with a Bachelor of Arts in 1973, and a Bachelor of Laws with first-class honours and a University Medal in 1976.

During his studies, Keane worked as a law clerk at Roberts & Kane Solicitors and was headhunted by Feez Ruthning (now Allens Linklaters) by one of the partners.

Keane read for a Bachelor of Civil Law at Magdalen College of the University of Oxford and was awarded the Vinerian Scholarship, a scholarship given to the student that "gives the best performance in the examination for the Degree of Bachelor of Civil Law". Having earned a B.C.L. with First-Class Honours in 1977, he then returned to Australia.

Career

Pre-judicial career
Keane was admitted as a Solicitor and Barrister of the Supreme Court of Queensland in 1976 and went to the bar, as a Barrister of the Supreme Court of Queensland, in 1977. During 1978–1979, he was a part-time lecturer at the University of Queensland.

In 1988, after 11 years at the bar, Keane took silk.

In 1992, Keane was appointed Solicitor-General of Queensland, a position he held under Labor and Coalition state governments until his appointment to the Court of Appeal of the Supreme Court of Queensland.

Keane published a number of articles and has been outspoken on the quality of legislative drafting. During 1990–1992, he was the Deputy Chairman of the Queensland Law Reform Commission. In 2011, he condemned the "volume and complexity of federal laws", telling the Australian Financial Review that "opening the tax act is like entering the door to a parallel universe".

Judicial career
In 2005, Keane was appointed a Judge of Appeal of the Court of Appeal of the Supreme Court of Queensland, the highest court in that state.

On 10 February 2010, Commonwealth Attorney-General Robert McClelland announced that Keane would be appointed as the next Chief Justice of the Federal Court of Australia. Keane took up that role on 22 March 2010.

On 8 June 2015, he was named a Companion of the Order of Australia for eminent service to the law and to the judiciary, through contributions to improved legal and public administration, as an advocate for increased access to justice, to ethical standards, and to a range of professional organisations.

High Court career
On 20 November 2012, Attorney-General Nicola Roxon announced that Keane had been appointed a Justice of the High Court of Australia effective on the retirement of Dyson Heydon on 1 March 2013. Keane became the 50th Justice appointed to the High Court. Keane's position as Chief Justice on the Federal Court bench was filled by James Allsop, the president of the NSW Court of Appeal.

Top Court of Appeal (Hong Kong) 
In 2023, Keane was nominated as a non-permanent judge at the age of 70. The appointment comes after two other international judges resigned from the positions after citing issues with the government crackdown on freedoms in the region. 

Keane's appointment is still pending a review with the Hong Kong legislative council, but is likely to proceed without an impediment.

Personal life
In 1974, aged 22, Keane married Shelley, with whom he has three sons and five grandchildren. Dr. Shelley Keane is a psychologist. His son Patrick was born in Oxford in December 1976. His son David is a barrister.

The Australian reported that Keane is said to have been close to former Prime Minister and fellow Queenslander Kevin Rudd and that Keane has been described by one unnamed Brisbane barrister as a "Labor man". Keane's appointment met with bipartisan approval: the Liberal Party's justice spokesperson, Senator George Brandis, described Keane's appointment as "the right decision" and Keane himself as a "very, very distinguished lawyer, both academically and professionally" with "a very illustrious reputation".

Keane is a supporter of the Brisbane Lions and the Carlton Blues AFL clubs and enjoys cricket, even having once considered playing the sport professionally.

References

 

Justices of the High Court of Australia
Chief Justices of the Federal Court of Australia
Judges of the Federal Court of Australia
Judges of the Supreme Court of Queensland
Solicitors-General of Queensland
Australian barristers
Australian King's Counsel
People educated at St Joseph's College, Gregory Terrace
Alumni of Magdalen College, Oxford
University of Queensland alumni
People from Brisbane
Australian people of Irish descent
1952 births
Living people
Companions of the Order of Australia